New Politics was a term used in the United States in the 1950s to denote the ascending ideology of that country's Democratic Party during that decade. It is strongly identified with Adlai Stevenson, the party's unsuccessful candidate for president in both 1952 and 1956; in each case, Stevenson lost to Republican Dwight Eisenhower.

Ideology 
The domestic policies advocated by the adherents of the New Politics movement stressed strong support for civil rights legislation, while in foreign affairs the movement favored a less aggressive posture toward the Soviet Union (criticizing "Cold War liberals" within the party such as Harry Truman and Dean Acheson), prompting its critics to accuse it of being "soft on Communism."

Followers 
Younger adults accounted for many of its members, and provided it with an aura of youthful vibrance — this fact leading some opponents to attempt to link it to so-called "beatniks" (that term having been coined in 1958 by San Francisco Chronicle columnist Herb Caen). However, this may not have been accurate as most of the prominent "Beat" writers of that era expressed little if any interest in electoral politics.

History 
The New Politics movement threw its support behind John F. Kennedy in his successful bid for the presidency in 1960, but was not happy with Kennedy's choice of Lyndon B. Johnson as his running mate. Soon thereafter, the New Politics movement found itself eclipsed by the more strident New Left as the putative purveyor of new ideas within the Democratic Party.

See also 

 American political development

Factions in the Democratic Party (United States)
Political history of the United States